Alan James Eagles (6 September 1933 – 6 November 1995) was an English footballer who played as a full-back in the Football League for Leyton Orient, Colchester United and Aldershot. He made over 100 appearances in the Football League between 1957 and 1963.

Career

Born in Edgware, London, Eagles began his career with Carshalton Athletic. He joined Football League club Leyton Orient in 1957, making 75 league appearances for the club.

In January 1961, Eagles moved to Colchester United, where he spent the second half of the 1960–61 season, making 16 appearances and scoring one goal. He made his debut for the U's on 14 January in a 2–0 loss to Coventry City, and made his final appearance on 3 April 1961 in a 3–0 defeat by Walsall. His solitary goal for Colchester came on 25 February in an Essex derby match against Southend United, which the U's lost 2–1.

On leaving Colchester, Eagles joined Queens Park Rangers, but failed to make an appearance, moving to Aldershot instead and making 15 appearances between 1961 and 1963, scoring once. He went on to play for non-league clubs Yiewsley, Deal Town and Gravesend & Northfleet.

Eagles later moved to Tenby, Wales, where he became the harbourmaster and played for non-league club Pembroke Borough. Eagles died on 6 November 1995 aged 62.

References

1933 births
1995 deaths
Footballers from Edgware
English footballers
Association football fullbacks
Carshalton Athletic F.C. players
Leyton Orient F.C. players
Colchester United F.C. players
Queens Park Rangers F.C. players
Aldershot F.C. players
Hillingdon Borough F.C. players
Deal Town F.C. players
Ebbsfleet United F.C. players
Pembroke Borough A.F.C. players
English Football League players